Knight's Pass is a mountain pass located in the KwaZulu-Natal province of South Africa near Utrecht.

References

Mountain passes of KwaZulu-Natal